Jelena Nišavić , born 17 September 1980) is a Serbian handballer. She plays for RK Radnički Kragujevac and also is a member of the Serbian national team.

Individual awards 
 Carpathian Trophy Top Scorer: 2011

References

External links
EHF profile

Living people
1980 births
Handball players from Belgrade
Serbian female handball players

Mediterranean Games silver medalists for Serbia
Competitors at the 2005 Mediterranean Games
Mediterranean Games medalists in handball